Robert Theodore Bockstael (15 February 1923 – 28 June 2017) was a Liberal party member of the House of Commons of Canada. A businessman by career, he was the longtime manager of Bockstael Construction in Winnipeg until his entry into politics; the firm is still in operation today under the management of Bockstael's son John.

Bockstael initially attempted to enter national politics in a 16 October 1978 by-election at Manitoba's Saint Boniface electoral district but was defeated by Jack Hare of the Progressive Conservative party. Months later in the 1979 general election, he won the riding from Hare. After re-election in 1980 federal election, he was defeated in the 1984 federal election by Léo Duguay of the Progressive Conservatives and left federal politics after that. Bockstael served in the 31st and 32nd Canadian Parliaments.

His nephew, also named Robert Bockstael, is a noted actor.

Electoral history

References

External links
 

1923 births
2017 deaths
Canadian people of Belgian descent
Businesspeople from Winnipeg
Liberal Party of Canada MPs
Members of the House of Commons of Canada from Manitoba
People from Saint Boniface, Winnipeg
Politicians from Winnipeg